Hygraula is a genus of moths of the family Crambidae.

Species
Hygraula nitens (Butler, 1880)
Hygraula pelochyta (Turner, 1937)

References

Acentropinae
Crambidae genera
Taxa named by Edward Meyrick